Exposed is the fourth studio album by American R&B singer Chanté Moore. It was released by Silas Records and MCA Records on November 14, 2000 in the United States. Moore worked with a variety of producers and songwriters on the album, including executive producer Jermaine Dupri as well as Bryan Michael Cox, Tim & Bob, Laney Stewart, Tricky Stewart, Donnie Scantz, and Katrina Willis. The album peaked at number fifty on the US Billboard 200 and entered the top ten of the US Top R&B/Hip-Hop Albums in the week of December 2, 2000. Exposed was preceded by the release of three singles, including "Straight Up", "Bitter" and "Take Care of Me".

Critical reception

At Metacritic, which assigns a normalized rating out of 100 to reviews from mainstream critics, Exposed has an average score of 66 based on 4 reviews, indicating "generally favorable reviews." In the December 30, 2000 issue of Billboard, contributor David Nathan listed Exposed at number three on his Critic's Choice list. Nathan expressed, 'long-awaited mainstream breakthrough album shows she can compete with the best of 'em'. Steve Kurutz from Allmusic stated  that "Exposed, which was executive produced by Dupri and recorded mainly in Atlanta [...] makes a bid to capture some of that trademark funkiness. Moore has a great set of pipes, a mix of the throaty take charge style of Toni Braxton and the soft vulnerability of Janet Jackson, an undeniable sexiness, and a real emotional conviction that lends the songs an authenticity absent in many current releases."

Track listing

Notes
 denotes co-producer

Charts

Weekly charts

Year-end charts

References

External links
 

2000 albums
Chanté Moore albums
Albums produced by Tim & Bob
Albums produced by Bryan-Michael Cox
Hip hop albums by American artists